Woodhouse Eaves is a village in Charnwood Forest, Leicestershire, England. 

Nearby are the villages of Quorn, Swithland, and Newtown Linford. Breakback Road leads from the village to Nanpantan and Loughborough.

The church of St Paul is a granite building  with a slate roof, constructed to the designs of William Railton in 1837 and extended by Ewan Christian in 1880.

Notable people
 Former Nottingham Forest, Leicester City and England goalkeeper Peter Shilton lived in Woodhouse Eaves.
 Tennis player Katie Boulter.

References

External links

Villages in Leicestershire
Borough of Charnwood